Karim Debbagh (born January 25, 1972, in Tangier) is a Moroccan film producer.

Life and work 
In 1997 Debbagh went to Germany to study Film Production at the Film Academy Baden-Württemberg. In 2002 he finished his studies, and received his diploma. Afterward. Debbagh worked as line producer and unit production manager in Germany. Debbagh returned to his hometown of Tangier in 2003. There he founded his production company Kasbah-Films Tangier GmbH, which has produced and coproduced various international films.

Personal life 
Karim Debbagh was a friend of the American composer and author Paul Bowles.

Filmography

Awards 
2012: Dubai International Film Festival - Nominated for the Muhr Arab Award in the category Best Film - Short for The Curse
2013: Tangier Mediterranean Short Film Festival - Festival Award in the category Best Film for AL Hadaf-La Cible

References

External links 
 
 Kasbah-film's official website

1972 births
Living people
Moroccan film producers
People from Tangier